Sodwalls is a small hamlet in New South Wales, Australia

Sodwalls used to have a railway station on the Main Western Railway. This line is used by the Central West XPT service from Sydney to Dubbo with stops at Rydal to the east and Tarana to the west.

Theresa (Cissie) McLaughlin, a Catholic nun who was superior of Our Lady's Nurses for the Poor in Sydney, was born in Sodwalls in 1890.

Heritage listings
Sodwalls has a number of heritage-listed sites, including:
 off Cuthill Road: Cox's Road and Early Deviations - Sodwalls, Fish River Descent Precinct

References

Localities in New South Wales
Main Western railway line, New South Wales